The characters of  exist amongst various iterations of reality within the series referred to as an A.R. World (Another Rider's/Alternate Reality World).

Hikari Studio
The  is the photography studio that the Hikari family owns and where Tsukasa Kadoya develops his photographs. The various backdrops located in the studio allow it to transport its occupants to a multitude of parallel worlds. Its interior and exterior automatically transform to blend into the surroundings when moving across dimensions.

Tsukasa Kadoya
 is a hypocritical and self-righteous man whose had no memory of his past, having a strong desire to "catch the world" using his photos. But the fact that Tsukasa's photo never develop well hint him to be from another world while unaware of the effect as prelude of a convergence of the alternate dimensions known as A.R. Worlds that threaten the main universe. Approached by Wateru Kurenai while acquiring the DecaDriver, Tsukasa begins a journey to other Kamen Riders' worlds to save the prime universe as Kamen Rider Decade. But Tsukasa soon understands what Narutaki meant upon learning that he was originally the Great Leader of the Dai-Shocker organization which sought to take all dimensions and that his true mission is to destroy the other A.R. World Riders and their worlds. Tsukasa undertakes the role, sealing the A.R. World Riders in cards before being fatally wounded by Natsumi when she becomes Kamen Rider Kiva-la. His death being the catalyst for the restoration of all the A.R. Worlds and those who died during the Rider War, Tsukasa is revealed by his friends' memories as he, the revived Kamen Riders, and Kamen Rider W defeat newly formed Super Shocker and the revived Neo Organism. Afterwards, Tsukasa and his friends return to the Hikari Studio to continue in their journey across the A.R. Worlds.

During the events of Kamen Rider × Kamen Rider W & Decade: Movie War 2010, Decade becomes a destructive embodiment of himself known as  before he was defeated by Natsumi as Kamen Rider Kiva-la.

While in the World of Negatives, Tsukasa acquires the  touchscreen cell phone that attach onto the DecaDriver, replacing the card slot which is moved to his right hip, to enable Decade to assume his true . In this form, he can manipulate the power of other Riders' final forms, whom he can summon through the K-Touch, for powerful combo attacks.

During the events of Kamen Rider × Super Sentai: Super Hero Taisen, Narutaki restores Dai-Shocker and enters an alliance with the Super Sentai villains that formed the Dai-Zangyack. Tsukasa, feigning to resume his role as Dai-Shocker's leader, declares war on the Super Sentai and battled Captain Marvelous of the Gokaigers to an epic standstill before faking their deaths to catch the villains off guard once they reveal their actual plan to take over the world. Tsukasa also appears in the Kamen Rider Wizard finale when summoned by the sorcerer Amadum to attack Haruto, only to aid his successor defeat the villain before departing for points unknown. 

Tsukasa later returns during the events of Kamen Rider Zi-O to help change Sogo Tokiwa's destiny and ensure he becomes a hero instead of a tyrant using the  belt to access the powers and forms of his successor Riders up to Kamen Rider Zi-O. In the special episode Rider Time: Kamen Rider Zi-O vs. Decade: Seven Zi-O!, he gains an upgraded version of the K-Touch that allows him to transform into an upgraded version of his Complete Form called , which allows him to access the powers of all Riders' final forms from Kamen Rider Kuuga's Ultimate Form to Kamen Rider Zero-Two.

Natsumi Hikari
But they never carry out their intent and return to school, promising to meet again years later. At the start, Natsumi begins to have nightmares of Decade prior to finding Decade's belt and giving it to Tsukasa. Fully aware of world's endangerment, Natsumi decides to accompany Tsukasa on his journey to prevent her dream from coming true.

She occasionally keeps Tsukasa in line with the  but she had also used the technique on other people such as Yusuke and her grandfather. She also appears to have feelings for Tsukasa, or at least cares for his well-being, which is hinted during her conversation with Yusuke Onodera. Despite Narutaki's offer to save her, she refuses and chooses to see Decade's journey to the end.

However she starts worrying during the time in the World of Hibiki after hearing from Narutaki that Decade's action is actually destroying the world. While in the World of Shinkenger, Natsumi assures Tsukasa that the Photo Studio is his home before her near-death experience by Apollo Geist in the World of RX, learning that Tsukasa used some of his life to save her later. It is only after their adventures in the World of Amazon that Natsumi ponders if there's a point behind their journey.

In Kamen Rider Decade: The Last Story, Natsumi becomes  with the use of Kivala, but unlike Kiva, the belt does not materialize first and it does not require Kivala's bite. Instead, it is a kiss to the user's forehead, which then creates a heart-shaped emblem and  she becomes the  after transformation. Also different is that Kivala does not perch on her belt during the transformation. Natsumi/Kivala also uses the butt of the Kivala Sabre to perform a variation on Natsumi's trademark "Hikari Secret Technique-Laughter Pressure Point" with a Shocker Combatant as the target. Natsumi transforms into Kamen Rider Kivala to stop Decade Violent Emotion's rampage, being described as the only one able to do so. She later transforms to help Decade, Kuuga, and Diend in order to defeat the rest of Super Shocker, as well as rescue her grandfather from the Super Crisis Fortress. Like Kiva, Kamen Rider Kivala's motif is that of a bat.

Eijiro Hikari
 is the owner of the Hikari Studio and Natsumi's grandfather. When he discovers that his photo studio is the means of accessing the A.R. Worlds by accident, he is not surprised but amused at the fact and is glad to assist Tsukasa in his mission. Whenever they arrive to a different world, he cooks a different meal each time. Eijiro is also the most easygoing of the group and gets along well with Kivala.

In the World of Decade, Eijiro is revealed to be a guise assumed by Shocker's , an executive member of Dai-Shocker from Switzerland. Doctor Death has the ability to assume the form of the Inhumanoid , a squid monster, which he claims is his greatest creation. Though seemingly killed in the final battle by Decade, Diend, and Momotaros using several other Riders as weapons, Doctor Death resumes his Eijiro guise, who seemingly forgets ever being Doctor Death to begin with.

That is also the explanation for Eijiro becoming Doctor Death in the previous movie. He revives the Neo Organism to defeat Kamen Rider Decade once and for all. However, Super Doctor Death reverts to Eijiro as the Memory ejects out of him caused by Kamen Rider W Heat Metal's HardMammother Maximum Drive and he is saved by Natsumi in her Kamen Rider Kiva-la form. Afterwards he returns to the studio with the others once Ultimate D is destroyed by Decade and W.

Yusuke Onodera
 is a young man with a childlike personality at first who has the power to become . Although originally from the World of Kuuga, he eventually joins up with the Hikari Studio group having rid his home world of the Gurongi.

Kivala
 is a white-colored female Kivat originally from the World of Kiva, where she is Kivat-bat the 3rd's younger sister. She is extremely tiny, small enough to be hidden in an adult's closed fist. She learns of Decade from Narutaki, and uses her power to bring Yusuke into her world, and then sends Tsukasa into another to do battle with Kaixa. She later ends up traveling with the Hikari Studio, though remaining in contact with Narutaki with only Natsumi aware of it. She seems to like Yusuke the most out of the traveling group as she is delighted when he returns to travel with them after they leave the World of Agito. In the World of Hibiki, she assists Ouja in summoning a Bakegani to be used on Decade as Gyuki was not getting the job done, placing her overall goals further into question.

In Kamen Rider × Kamen Rider W & Decade: Movie War 2010, Kiva-la is revealed to be the means for Natsumi to assume her Kamen Rider form: Kamen Rider Kivala.

Narutaki
 is the central antagonist of the series, a mysterious man who refers to himself as a prophet and is able to freely travel the worlds with immunity to the convergence of the ten worlds. He also has the ability to move freely between the worlds and summon Riders from other worlds. He firmly believes that Decade should not exist in any world, tending to say  while tricking the Riders of various worlds to kill him. Arranging a meeting with Natsumi, Narutaki proceeds to tell her that her dreams are tied to the Rider War that will awaken Decade's true nature. After Decade defied his premonitions of doom in the previous nine worlds, Narutaki decides to personally deal with him in the World of Hibiki by summoning a Bakegani, revealing to Natsumi that Tsukasa's actions are actually destroying the worlds rather than saving them as they were told, and that only she can stop the madness now. However at the World of Negatives, Narutaki expresses his joy over Decade finding himself a world which he can exist in. In the World of the Rider War, he asks for Tsukasa's help to stop Apollo Geist from speeding up the destruction of all worlds, but this doesn't change his belief that Tsukasa is the true cause of the destruction, or his desire to see Tsukasa killed.

The original Zol is the leader of Shocker's German branch and has the ability to transform into the Inhumanoid , but Narutaki as Zol does not transform in the movie. However, when Doras fell from the Super Crisis Fortress and knocks him out of his way, he reverts to Narutaki and curses Decade for causing a new calamity born from the Neo Organism's antics before running off into another dimension.

Like the original Doktor G, he wields an axe in battle and is able to assume the form of the Inhumanoid . He was defeated by the card-using Kamen Riders using the Goseigers' Tensou Cards before he reverts to Narutaki as he curses Decade again before departing into another dimension.

He appeared once again during the crossover special between Kamen Rider Gaim and Ressha Sentai ToQger. He gave Kota a Rainbow Pass, tells him to give the Conductor and Ticket his regards and leaves, but not before cryptically warning him and Right about an inevitable war between Kamen Riders.

Daiki Kaito
He seems to know more about Tsukasa than Tsukasa himself does, being an ally one minute and an enemy the next when it suited his thieving needs. He first reveals himself to Tsukasa during his travels to the World of Blade, and reveals that he is Diend while in the World of Faiz, following Tsukasa and the Hikari Studio ever since. Prior to the beginning of the series, Daiki had left his home world (World of Diend) for crimes he committed there, only to return when the Hikari Studio group finds its way there.

Dai-Shocker
The mysterious  organization is a conglomeration of all villain organizations who set into motion a plan to take over all dimensions due to someone providing the means to do so. Based on the World of Decade, their insignia is double-headed version of Shocker's eagle crest, but with the "DCD" written on it that hints at Decade's ties to them. In addition to Doctor Shinigami and Doktor G, there are many other members of Dai-Shocker that come from previous Kamen Rider Series. They sent their agents out across the worlds for universal domination. During the events of Kamen Rider × Super Sentai: Super Hero Taisen, Tsukasa Kadoya reforms Dai-Shocker and becomes their Great Leader once more in order to take down the Super Sentai teams and the Dai-Zangyack group led by Captain Marvelous. However, it is revealed that it was a plot between Dai-Shocker and Dai-Zangyack all along to have the Super Sentai and the Kamen Riders wipe out each other. Both groups of villains are defeated after Tsukasa and Marvelous reveal to them that they knew about their scheme all the time, having the heroes they supposedly "destroyed" sent to an alternate dimension and summoned back all together for the final battle with them.

Apollo Geist
The first member of Dai-Shocker Tsukasa confronts,  is the Security Chief of Dai-Shocker, hastening the worlds' convergence to make invasion easy for his organization. He normally assumes the form of a man called  until he invokes . However, his lifespan is short as a result and thus uses the Perfecter to take the life force out of people to augment his own. When the Perfecter is stolen from him by Diend and then destroyed by Decade, Apollo Geist eventually comes up with the plan to marry Yuki, the Fangire Queen, becoming a Fangire as a result. As a result of his transformation, he now becomes  with the ability to remove other realities from existence. Using his power to revive the monsters from the Nine Worlds and attempting to make Natsumi his bride after Yuki is destroyed by Decade Complete Form, Super Apollo Geist fights Decade and Diend until help arrives in the form of Hibiki and Kiva. Kiva and Hibiki distract Super Apollo Geist long enough for him to be mortally wounded by Decade Complete Form with Diend's power, Geist swearing that he will "revive as the greatest nuisance in the universe" before he is destroyed. Later revived during the events of Super Hero Taisen, Apollo Geist is destroyed again by Kamen Rider Fourze in Magnet States.

In Super Hero Taisen, Apollo Geist is voiced by Kimito Totani who portrays Daiki Kaito.

Llumu Qhimil
 is the leader of Geddon and Dai-Shocker's designated ruler of the World of Amazon, developing the mindset that Kamen Riders are the enemies of the human race, rather than Geddon. He has the GaGa Armlet and seeks Amazon's GiGi Armlet to gain their full power and use the unlimited ancient Inca powers to complete his master plan of converting humans into monsters. He normally resembles a torso attached to a large boulder, but he can also assume a humanoid form adorned with the faces of the ten Heisei Kamen Riders from which he can access their powers and counter any of the ten Heisei Kamen Riders attacks. Though he gains the GiGi Armlet, he loses both it and the GaGa Armlet to the Kamen Riders with Decade Complete Form weakening him with Faiz Blaster Form before Amazon destroys him with the Super Dai Setsudan.

Ambassador Hell
He is able to assume the form of the Inhumanoid , a rattlesnake monster. In the final battle, he fights Kamen Riders 1, 2, Black RX, and Kabuto. He is killed when Riders 1 and 2 use a Rider Double Kick on him after being stabbed by Kabuto and impaled by Black RX, he praises Dai-Shocker before finally succumbing to his wounds and dying in a huge explosion.

General Jark
 is a supreme commander of the Crisis Empire from the World of Black RX. He is killed by Diend. Jark reappears in Super Hero Taisen as part of the new Dai-Shocker assembled by Tsukasa. After Dai-Shocker's alliance with Dai-Zangyack is revealed, Jark is once again defeated along Shadow Moon by the combined forces of Kamen Rider Black and the Maskmen.

 reprises his role as the voice of General Jark.

King Dark
 is a giant robot and the mastermind behind the Government Of Darkness (GOD) from the World of X-Rider. He is killed by Decade Complete Form Jumbo Formation.

Dai-Shocker Combatmen
The  are footsoldiers of Dai-Shocker, resembling the Shocker Combatmen and tending to scream out . They are able to assume missile-like forms.

Nine Worlds

The  are the A.R. Worlds that are based on the previous entries of the Kamen Rider Series that have aired during the Heisei period of Japanese history. Each differs in some way from the series on which it was based.

New Worlds

The  are the A.R. Worlds that are not based on a previous entry of the Kamen Rider Series from the Heisei period. They range from Daiki Kaito's homeworld to a crossover with Samurai Sentai Shinkenger to reimaginations of Kamen Rider Black & Kamen Rider Black RX to an alternate Kamen Rider Amazon to the World of the Rider War and Tsukasa's home A.R. World.

Cameo appearances

Various characters in Kamen Rider Decade are directly from their original Kamen Rider Series and are portrayed, or voiced, by the original actors. These characters do not appear to be affiliated with any side, as some assist Tsukasa, while others seek to fight Decade.

Wataru Kurenai
 is the original  who represents the others by giving Tsukasa his mission while they freeze Natsumi's world in place to give him time to stop its destruction. He later appears in the World of the Rider War to fight Decade after telling him his mission was to destroy the Riders in the Nine Worlds rather than befriend them.

 reprises his role as Wataru Kurenai from Kamen Rider Kiva.

Kamen Rider KickHopper
In Decade, KickHopper is a wild card Kamen Rider who uses a fighting style themed around kicking attacks. He and his partner PunchHopper appear in the World of Kuuga during a dimensional distortion caused by Narutaki to fight Decade. However, when they start focusing their rage on Kuuga, Narutaki causes another dimensional distortion that sends the two to another world. KickHopper later appears in the World of Decade to prevent Dai-Shocker from taking over, but soon defects to the side of Dai-Shocker.

 reprises his voice as Kamen Rider KickHopper from Kamen Rider Kabuto.

Kamen Rider PunchHopper
In Decade, PunchHopper is a wildcard Kamen Rider who uses a fighting style themed around punching attacks.

 reprises his voice as Kamen Rider PunchHopper from Kamen Rider Kabuto.

Kamen Rider Kaixa
In Decade, Kaixa is a wildcard Kamen Rider who attacks Decade after he is taken to another world by Kiva-la. He is under the impression that Decade is a hindrance to his own agenda and seeks to take the DecaDriver from him. He eventually concedes when Decade is returned to the World of Kiva.

Kamen Rider Kaixa reappears briefly in later airings of the series finale, using his Side Basshar to attack Decade and Wataru's group. He is seemingly killed in the chaos afterwards alongside many other Riders. In Kamen Rider Decade: The Last Story, Decade is shown to hold a Side Basshar card, labeled as a Kaixa card.

 reprises his voice as Kamen Rider Kaixa from Kamen Rider 555.

Kamen Rider Ouja
In Decade, Ouja is summoned in the World of Hibiki by Kiva-la, wielding a kanabō which he uses to summon a Bakegani from the mountain side after knocking Kiva-la aside. Ouja later appears in the World of Decade to prevent Dai-Shocker from taking over, but soon defects to the side of Dai-Shocker.

 reprises his voice as Kamen Rider Ouja from Kamen Rider Ryuki.

Kotaro Minami
 is the original , who was transformed into a Century King mutant cyborg by the cult Gorgom during his 19th birthday and later evolved into  during his battles against alien invaders known as the Crisis Empire. In addition to his appearances as separate alternate beings in the World of Black RX and World of Black episodes, he also appears untransformed at the end of Kamen Rider Decade: All Riders vs. Dai-Shocker.

 reprises his role as Kotaro Minami from Kamen Rider Black and Kamen Rider Black RX.

Shouichi Tsugami
, born , is the original . He appears untransformed at the end of Kamen Rider Decade: All Riders vs. Dai-Shocker along with Kotaro Minami.

 has a cameo appearance reprising his role as Shouichi Tsugami from Kamen Rider Agito.

Kamen Rider W
 is the duo of Detective  and his partner , two young private investigators from the city of Futo that fights the Dopant menace. In Kamen Rider Decade: All Riders vs. Dai-Shocker, W has a cameo appearance where he fights Shadow Moon. W also appears in Movie War 2010 to battle Super Shocker with Decade.

Kazuma Kenzaki
 is the original  as well as the second Joker who appears about 5 years after the series original ending in the World of Rider War as the A.R. Worlds continue to fuse. He is first seen with Natsumi Hikari, pointing out to her that Dai-Shocker isn't the real enemy. As Natsumi asks in question, he had already left the scene. He then appears before Asumu, Wataru, Yusuke Onodera, and Daiki Kaito and says that their true enemy is Tsukasa, using them to force him to leave while he can or destroy him if he refuses. It is noteworthy that Kenzaki is able to transform directly to King Form using just the Change Beetle card alone as the belt now uses Kamen Rider Leangle's "Open Up!" feature, rather than the original "Turn Up!" feature, projecting a gold version of the transformation screen that depicts the Evolution Caucasus beetle. As Kenzaki attempts to force Tsukasa to leave the world, he refuses, transforming into Kamen Rider Decade. But Tsukasa proved no match as Kenzaki overpowers him throughout the entire fight. Kenzaki then directly uses The Royal Straight Flush to finish the fight as he severely injures Tsukasa. He then assumes King Form and teams up with Wataru Kurenai and the rest of the Kamen Riders to fight Tsukasa in the Rider War.

In Kamen Rider × Kamen Rider W & Decade: Movie War 2010: Decade: The Last Story, Kenzaki in his regular form teams up with Shinji Kido, Kamen Rider Ryuki, to fight Tsukasa. But Tsukasa gains the upper hand as he transforms into Decade Violent Emotion. As he overpowers both of them, Tsukasa turns Kenzaki into "Blade Blade" and kills Shinji. With Kenzaki stunned, Tsukasa finally activates his "Final Attack Ride" and kills Kenzaki as well, resulting in both Kamen Riders being turned into cards. He is later revived, as well as the rest of the Kamen Riders after Tsukasa is voluntarily destroyed. But Kenzaki mysteriously disappears as he did not take part in the final battle against Super Shocker. Instead, it would be Kazuma Kendate, Kenzaki's alternate reality version to help Tsukasa and the rest of the Kamen Riders in the battle against Super Shocker, assuming King Form with Decade's K-Touch.

 reprises his role as Kazuma Kenzaki from Kamen Rider Blade.

References

External links
 Cast and Characters at TV Asahi

Decade
Kamen Rider Decade

ja:仮面ライダーディケイドの登場人物